The Panafrican Film and Television Festival of Ouagadougou (Festival panafricain du cinéma et de la télévision de Ouagadougou or FESPACO) is a film festival in Burkina Faso, held biennially in Ouagadougou, where the organization is based. It accepts for competition only films by African filmmakers and chiefly produced in Africa. FESPACO is scheduled in March every second year, two weeks after the last Saturday of February. Its opening night is held in the Stade du 4-Août, the national stadium.

The festival offers African film professionals the chance to establish working relationships, exchange ideas, and to promote their work. FESPACO's stated aim is to "contribute to the expansion and development of African cinema as means of expression, education and awareness-raising". It has also worked to establish a market for African films and industry professionals. Since FESPACO's founding, the festival has attracted attendees from across the continent and beyond.

Founding
Created in 1969, it was first called the Pan-African film and television festival of Ouagadougou. It has evolved into an internationally recognized and respected event. Alimata Salambere, the cultural minister of Burkina Faso from 1987 to 1991, was one of the founders of the festival. At its third edition in 1972, the festival was named FESPACO for short, keeping its full title as Festival pan-Africain du cinema et de la television de Ouagadougou. FESPACO was recognized formally as an institution by governmental decree on January 7, 1972. Its award ceremony and base of operations is Ouagadougou, the capital of Burkina Faso, where the annual awards ceremony is also held.

In 1972 the first winner of the best film award was Le Wazzou Polygame by Oumarou Ganda of Niger.  Since then, the best film award has been won by directors from Cameroon, Morocco, Mali, Nigeria, Ivory Coast, Algeria, Burkina Faso, Ghana and the Democratic Republic of the Congo.

Evolution from 1969 to 2022
At the festival's founding in 1969, five African nations: Upper Volta (Burkina Faso), Cameroon, Ivory Coast, Niger and Senegal, were represented, as well as France and the Netherlands. A total of 23 films were shown. At its second edition, the participant African countries rose to nine, including for the first time Algeria, Tunisia, Guinea, Mali, and Ghana, and a total of 40 films were shown. In 1983, the festival included MICA (le Marche International du Cinema et de la television Africaine), a market for African film stock and video footage.

From 1985 onward, the festival adopted different themes for the annual event, starting with "the cinema, people, and liberation". The theme for the 2007 festival was "the actor in the creation and promotion of African films".

As the festival became more prominent, its budget and sponsors increased; the donor countries include Burkina Faso, Denmark, Finland, France, Germany, Netherlands, Sweden, Republic of China. Donor organizations include AIF (ACCT), PNUD, UNESCO, UNICEF, European Union and Africalia. Due to its international recognition, FESPACO has enabled African filmmakers to show their talents and sell their products in the international market, as well as to promote development of African products and technicians in the industry.

The delegate generals of FESPACO since 1972 have been Louis Tombiano, from 1972 to 1982; Alimata Salembere, from 1982 to 1984; Filippe Savadogo, from 1984 to 1996, Baba Hama, from 1996 to 2008, Michel Ouedraogo, from 2008 to 2014, Ardiouma Soma, from 2014 to 2020, and Alex Moussa Sawadogo, from 2020 until present day.

Main initiatives
 African international film and television market: FESPACO is a festival that promotes African filmmakers and facilitates the screening of all African films. This unique festival in Africa enables contacts and exchange between film and audiovisual professionals of Africa and also contributes to the expansion and development of African cinema as a means of expression, education and awareness rising.
 Promotion of African cinema and culture: African cinema is promoted through publication of catalogues, FESPACO news, FESPACO newsletter, and maintenance of an African film library, which has film archives and a data bank. In addition, it supports a traveling cinema. As the festival allows exclusively African films in competition, it supports raising the quality of African films and the filmmakers.
 Non profit screenings in rural areas: FESPACO also promotes non-profit screenings in rural areas, in collaboration with non-governmental organizations or associations in schools and other public or private institutions.
 Promotion of African cinema in other international festivals: FESPACO organizes various film events, such as film week and film premieres. It also promotes African cinema in other international festivals.
 MINIFESPACO: promotion of FESPACO festival in national events. FESPACO organized  MINIFESPACO, held in Ouahigouya (Burkina Faso) from 5 to 8 Jun 2013, at Institut Olvido, to extend audiences for African films.

Awards 

The most prestigious award of the festival is the "Étalon d'or de Yennenga" (Golden Stallion of Yennenga or short Golden Stallion), named after the legendary founder of the Mossi empire. The "Étalon d'or de Yennenga" is awarded to the African film that best shows "Africa's realities".

Other special awards include the Oumarou Ganda Prize, given for the best first film, and the Paul Robeson Prize for the best film by a director of the African diaspora. (The latter is named for a major 20th-century American actor, singer and civil rights activist in the United States.)

See also

Film festivals in Africa
African cinema
Africa Movie Academy Awards
 List of television festivals

References

External links 
 The official Fespaco site
 Fespaco 2009 coverage on RFI English site
 Fespaco at the Internet Movie Database
 FESPACO Collection at Indiana University Bloomington Black Film Center/Archive
 BBC Coverage of FESPACO 2007 (with interviews and audio)
 BBC Coverage of 2005 FESPACO
 The Unlikely Home of Africa's Oscars by Katrina Manson, GlobalPost, March 12, 2009.

Film festivals in Burkina Faso
Ouagadougou
Television festivals
African film festivals
Arts organisations based in Burkina Faso
Biennial events
Film festivals established in 1969
1969 establishments in Upper Volta